Mathilde Hauge Harviken (born 29 December 2001) is a Norwegian Football player who plays for Rosenborg.

She debuted in Toppserien when she played for Fart in 2019. She signed for Røa in June 2020, who also played in Toppserien at the time. In December 2021, she signed for Rosenborg.

She has played matches for several Norway youth national teams, including U15, U16, U17, U19 and U23.

She was called up for the Norway national team  for the first time in August 2022. She got her debut 6 September 2022 at home in a world cup qualifying match against Albania.

In November 2022 she was again part of Norway's team who held England to a draw with an equaliser by Frida Maanum. England's Lionesses had been unbeaten in 2022 and this friendly was their last match of the year.

References 

Norwegian footballers
2001 births

Living people
Articles using sports links with data from Wikidata
Rosenborg BK Kvinner players